Shilovsky District is an administrative and municipal district (raion), one of the twenty-five in Ryazan Oblast, Russia. It is located in the center of the oblast. Its administrative center is the urban locality (a work settlement) of Shilovo. Population: 40,334 (2010 Census);  The population of Shilovo accounts for 38.9% of the district's total population.

References

Notes

Sources

Districts of Ryazan Oblast